The list of ship commissionings in 1935 includes a chronological list of all ships commissioned in 1935.


References 

1935
 Ship commissionings